Darren Moffat (born 9 August 1977) is a South African cricketer. He played in eleven first-class matches for Eastern Province in 1997/98 and 1998/99.

See also
 List of Eastern Province representative cricketers

References

External links
 

1977 births
Living people
South African cricketers
Eastern Province cricketers
Cricketers from Johannesburg